Irreplaceable is the first extended play by the Taiwanese Mandopop girl group S.H.E. It was released on August 26, 2016 by HIM International Music. The EP was commemorating for 15th anniversary of S.H.E's debut.

The track "Irreplaceable" (永遠都在) is listed at number 44 respectively on Hit FM's Annual Top 100 Singles Chart for 2016. The album is the 4th best selling album in Taiwan in 2016, with 45,000 copies sold. The album also received "Top 10 Selling Mandarin Albums of the Year" in the IFPI Hong Kong Album Sales Awards 2016.

Track listing

Music Videos

Special Event
 S.H.E "Reunion One in One"(團圓One in One) 15th Anniversary Special Exhibition in Songshan Cultural and Creative Park, Taipei, from August 26, 2016 to September 19, 2016.

References

2016 albums
S.H.E albums
HIM International Music albums